"Fool's Game" is a song by Michael Bolton. It was released in 1983 as a single from his self-titled album.

The song is Bolton's first Billboard Hot 100 entry, peaking at No. 82. A music video shot on a dark soundstage along with Bolton hanging out with girls and performing the track on said soundstage was also made for the song.

Chart performance

References

Michael Bolton songs
1983 singles
1983 songs
Columbia Records singles
Songs written by Michael Bolton
Songs written by Mark Mangold